The 1923 Montana football team represented the University of Montana in the 1923 college football season. They were led by second-year head coach John W. Stewart, played their home games at Dornblaser Field and finished the season with a record of four wins and four losses (4–4).

Schedule

References

Montana
Montana Grizzlies football seasons
Montana football